Adamsboro is an unincorporated community in Clay Township, Cass County, Indiana.

History
Adamsboro was platted in 1872 when the Eel River Railroad was extended to that point. It was named for its founder, George E. Adams.

Geography

References

External links

Unincorporated communities in Cass County, Indiana
Unincorporated communities in Indiana
1872 establishments in Indiana
Populated places established in 1872